The Little Tuya River is a tributary of the Tuya River in northwest part of the province of British Columbia, Canada.

The river's watershed's land cover is classified as 37.8% shrubland, 28.8% conifer forest, 14.6% mixed forest, 9.2% barren, and small amounts of other cover.

The Little Tuya River was named in association with the Tuya RIver. A tuya is a geologic term for a flat-topped, steep-sided volcano formed when lava erupts through a thick glacier or ice sheet. The geologic term comes from Tuya Butte, which was named in association with Tuya Lake. The term may come the Tahltan language.

The Little Tuya River is in the traditional territory of the Tahltan First Nation, of the Tahltan people.

Geography

The river flows south and east, first through Level Mountain's high and relatively barren lava plateau, then through rugged forested terrain. Its lower course flows through rugged forested terrain, where it is joined by its main tributary, Mansfield Creek. The Little Tuya RIver empties into the Tuya River near the abandoned settlement of Cariboo Meadows.

Geology
Coal has been found in rocks exposed in the drainage of the Little Tuya River and Mansfield Creek between the communities of Dease Lake and Telegraph Creek in northwestern BC. The coal was first discovered in 1904, but the main exploration of its economic potential occurred in the 1980s to 1990s.

See also
 List of British Columbia rivers

References 

Cassiar Land District
Level Mountain
Nahlin Plateau
Rivers of British Columbia
Stikine Country
Stikine Plateau
Tahltan